Patriarchy in China refers to the history and prevalence of male dominance in Chinese society and culture, although patriarchy is not exclusive to Chinese culture and exists all over the world.

History

Confucianism and Imperial China 

Confucian conceptions of filial piety has been focused on preserving the traditional role of the father as the primary leader and decision maker of the family. In the hierarchy of traditional Chinese cultural family life, the father and sons take prominence over the mother and daughters. A cliché of classical texts, which is repeated throughout the tradition, is the familiar notion that men govern the outer world, while women govern the home.

Mencius outlined the three subordinations. A woman was to be subordinate to her father in youth, her husband in maturity, and her son in old age. Familial relationships are prefixed, and family lifestyles and behaviors are constrained by social norms.

In the Han dynasty, the female historian Ban Zhao wrote the Lessons for Women, advice on how women should behave. She outlines the four virtues women must abide by: proper virtue, proper speech, proper countenance, proper merit. The "three subordinations and the four virtues" is a common four-character phrase throughout the imperial period.

As for the historical development of Chinese patriarchy, women's status was highest in the Tang dynasty, when women played sports (polo) and were generally freer in fashion and conduct. Between the Tang and Song dynasties, a fad for little feet arose, and from the Song dynasty onwards foot binding became more and more common for the elite. In the Ming dynasty, a tradition of virtuous widowhood developed. Widows, even if widowed at a young age, would be expected not to remarry. Their virtuous names might be displayed on the arch at the entrance of the village.

20th century onwards 
Features of patriarchy in 20th and 21st century China are a combination of contemporary problems found even in the West and traditional Chinese issues.

Men hold most of the major positions of power within the country, especially in the political and military spheres. However, with the decline of traditional practices through the 20th century, women have come to enjoy virtually equal economic power. This is especially true in the cities, where the social stigma of being a working woman is virtually nonexistent, although skepticism of unmarried, career-minded women is increasing. Although both genders face strong pressure to be married, women who remain unmarried past the age of 25 are shamed by state media with the label leftover women.

In addition, foot binding and arranged marriages have been virtually eradicated.

There is also the issue of forced abortions in China, especially for sex selection purposes; authorities have been accused of giving the women virtually no control over their bodies in this area.

Traditional norms regarding favoring the grandmother on the father's side persisted until after the Chinese Communist Party's victory in the Chinese Civil War. This traditional preference for the paternal grandmother was reflected in the word referring to the paternal grandmother (zumu) and the maternal grandmother (waizumu, meaning "outside grandmother"). The paternal grandmother would be the one who was expected to live with grandchildren and assist in their care and raising. Since the founding of the People's Republic of China, paternal and maternal grandmothers enjoy equal status.

See also

References

Chinese culture
Marriage in Chinese culture
Gender in Asia
Women in China
Cultural anthropology
Patriarchy